The Hyundai Elantra, also known as the Hyundai Avante, is a compact car produced by the South Korean manufacturer Hyundai since 1990. The Elantra was initially marketed as the Lantra in Australia and some European markets. In Australia, this was due to the similarly named Mitsubishi Magna Elante model; similarly, in other markets, the name Avante is not used due to its similarity with Audi's "Avant" designation, which is used for their line-up of station wagons. The name was standardized as "Elantra" worldwide in 2001 (except in South Korea and Singapore).



First generation (J1; 1990) 

Launched in October 1990, the Elantra (codename J1) received a mid-term facelift in 1993.

It was sold in Europe from the spring of 1991. It replaced the somewhat larger on the outside Stellar, although that model had not been offered in many markets. The Elantra competed with the likes of the Ford Sierra and Vauxhall Cavalier/Opel Vectra, but at a considerably lower price.

The Elantra was powered by a Mitsubishi-designed 1.6 L (1595 cc) straight-four. The quarter-mile (0.4 km) run took 17.1 seconds and produced . The Elantra got  in the city cycle. Starting in 1993 a Mitsubishi-designed 1.8 L (1836 cc) inline-four option was available; this unit produces  at 6000 rpm and replaced the twin-cam 1.6 in the home market.

Facelifts 

The vehicle was refreshed in 1992 for the European market, adding Hyundai's current logo to the grille, although North American models retained the previous year's look. In 1993, the vehicle was refreshed again. The third (second in North America) and final facelift of this generation occurred in 1994 for both front and rear fascias. The vehicle featured ABS brakes, front airbags, fog lamps, power-operated side mirrors, and optional alloy seven-spoke wheels.

Between 1995 to 1998, the first-generation Elantra was also produced and sold for the Indonesian market as the Bimantara Nenggala, it is only available in there with 1.6 L engine.

Second generation (J2/RD; 1995) 

Launched in 1995, the second generation (codename RD or J2) was offered as a sedan and station wagon. It was sold in the South Korean market as the "Hyundai Avante" in sedan form and "Avante Touring" in the wagon body style. Some export markets such as Australia and Europe received the series as the "Hyundai Lantra" as per the first generation. Australian market wagons were given the "Lantra Sportswagon" name.

In Europe, 1996 through 1997 sedan models had carried a silver Mercury-type false grille, while the wagon carried no front grille.

At launch, a 1.5 L Alpha SOHC inline-four engine and 1.8 L Beta DOHC gasoline I4 engine were available domestically. Later, a 1.5 L lean-burn gasoline engine based on the Alpha DOHC engine was added. The Philippine version, as well as in some European markets, had the 1.6 L (1599 cc) Beta, DOHC (G4GR) which produced (in some European markets ).

Facelift 
New grilles arrived in 1998 for the 1999 model year. The Lantra in Europe converged into a single-front end design, for both sedan and wagon. The model received the "RD2" or "J3" model codes. A PSA-built 1.9 L naturally-aspired diesel option was also added for some European markets, producing .

A new 2.0 L engine option became available. In Australia, the GLS model was an upgrade on the GL model and offered the 2.0 L engine, velour trim, softer cloth seats, and alloy wheels. The GLS had body-colored rear license plate light holder and exterior side-view mirrors.

Gallery

Third generation (XD; 2000) 

An all-new model (codename XD) was launched in 2000. The station wagon version was dropped in favor of a five-door Liftback. Starting in 2001, all American models came with standard front and front-side airbags, air conditioning, power locks, power windows, and power steering. This simplified dealer inventories and repairs and also sought to improve Hyundai's image of "value" cars.

Facelift 
In 2004, all models were refreshed (codename XD2); this introduced new headlights and tail lights, a new grille, new front and rear bumpers, a redesigned hood and trunk lid, as well as a redesigned dashboard.

The GLS trim is standard for the Elantra. The top-of-the-line model, the GT trim, came with a stiffer suspension, leather seats, fog lights, alloy wheels, lip spoiler, and blue-lit instrument cluster. Offered as a Liftback since 2001 as a 2002 model year vehicle, the only options for the GT were a power moonroof and anti-lock brakes with traction control. The only major option was a Kenwood MP3/CD deck. The GT trim sedan was introduced in 2003 and discontinued in 2005. The GT trim was replaced for the 2006 model year with the Limited trim, which featured new paint colors, a chrome vertical grille, leather interior with leather steering wheel and leather shifter and wood trim. The Limited trim featured steel rims with a 6-spoke cover featured in the GLS model. The GT trim for the five-door was produced for the remainder of the 2006 model year.

Canadian trim levels differed from that in the US: "GT" models came standard with alloy wheels, four-wheel disc brakes and ABS. Leather upholstery and TCS were only available on the "premium" GT edition.

The XD was available with 1.6-, 1.8- and 2.0-liter gasoline engines and a 2.0-liter turbo-diesel. North American models are available only with the 2.0-liter gasoline engine. The 1.8-liter engine is a 1.6-liter engine modified for the New Zealand market.

While compact on the outside, it was listed by the United States Environmental Protection Agency as a mid-size car because of a spacious interior. In 2006, the Elantra was offered with a SULEV emission rated engine in some US states.

In China, the Elantra XD was produced by Beijing Hyundai from 23 December 2003 to 2011. This car has been used as a taxicab in Beijing since 2005 and replaced the popular red Tianjin Xiali taxi in 2006 in an effort to cut down pollution. The Elantra is available in 5 door Liftback for 2007 and sedan form from 2003 to 2010. Pre facelifted models of the Elantra XD were produced for the 2004 model year and had a facelift in 2007 consisting of new headlights, radiator, rear foglights on the rear bumper, and new wheels. Production ran up to 2010. It was facelifted again for the 2011 model year featuring new front and rear lights, bumpers, a single rear bumper fog light, radiator and power-folding mirrors with integrated turn signals. A 1.6-liter engine is available on taxi and passenger cars paired with a 5-speed manual gearbox. A 1.8-liter engine was available until 2007.

Gallery

Engines

Fourth generation (HD; 2006) 

A redesigned sedan (designated HD) debuted at the 2006 New York International Auto Show for the 2007 model year. As before, the HD sold under the Hyundai Avante name in its South Korean home market. It used a resurrected appearance from the 1960s and 1970s called "coke bottle styling".

The engine lineup included 1.6- Gamma and 2.0 L Beta II gasoline inline-four engines, and a 1.6 L turbodiesel inline-four. All engines featured improved fuel economy. A five-speed manual transmission was standard with an optional four-speed automatic.

According to the Insurance Institute for Highway Safety (IIHS) the Elantra received a Good overall score in the frontal crash test and a Marginal overall score in the side impact test, but all Hyundai Elantras manufactured after November 2009 earned a Good overall score in the side impact test. Standard side airbags included front and rear head curtain airbags and front seat-mounted torso airbags.

Asia 

Beijing Hyundai launched a redesigned Elantra called the "Elantra Yue Dong" for the Chinese market with an updated exterior and a separate facelifted 2011 Elantra model. The model was later updated in 2017 and is currently known as the Hyundai Celesta.

North America 
Only the 2.0 L engine was offered in North America. Unlike the 2006 model year XD series, the 2007 model year base Hyundai Elantra GLS trim did not include air conditioning as standard equipment, but added side curtain airbags (previously front and side only), active head restraints and all-round disc brakes with four-channel ABS. The Elantra offered the most interior room in its class, leading the United States Environmental Protection Agency (EPA) to classify it as a mid-size car.

Hyundai offered the Hyundai i30 wagon in the U.S. and Canada marketed as the "Elantra Touring". Elsewhere, the same vehicle was marketed as the Hyundai i30cw.
 2008 model year: the "Limited" trim level was dropped, leaving "GLS" and "SE" trim choices. The SE trim included features not available on the "GLS" such as a telescopic steering wheel and electronic stability control (ESC), with sunroof and leather upholstery as options. According to Consumer Reports testing, the "SE" trim has significantly better handling and braking than the base "GLS" trim.
 2009 model year: iPod and USB interfaces became standard on the "SE" models. On the instrument panel, the gear shift indicator moved to the trip computer display, and the coolant temperature gauge was removed. "GLS" models received new wheel cover designs, and "SE" models had a rear garnish on the rear registration plate border. Exterior color choices now included Natural Khaki. The 2009 model year was J.D. Power's highest quality compact car. The study measured 228 attributes, including overall driving experience, engine and transmission, and a broad range of defect and design problems reported by vehicle owners. The 2008, 2009 and 2010 Elantra SE was consistently chosen as a Top Pick for compact sedans by Consumer Reports magazine.
 2010 model year: a new "Blue" trim was added, a basic model modified for increased fuel economy. The grille design was slightly modified and "Blue" and "GLS" models received chrome rear garnish. The interior received chrome door handles, new metallic interior finish, cup holders, and a chrome-trimmed gear selector for "SE" models. On "GLS" and "SE" models automatic transmission became standard, while the lesser "Blue" models only offered manual. The "GLS" offered sunroof or an LG navigation system; "SE" included a choice of two packages: a sunroof with heated seats or a sunroof with heated seats, LG navigation and Bluetooth. iPod and USB connectivity became standard on the "GLS" and available on the "Blue". Exterior color choices were slightly changed, with Nordic White and Black Noir Pearl replacing the Captiva White and Black Pearl, respectively; Purple Rain was deleted.

Canadian trim levels were different from the US models. The base model "L" offered a base package with a four-speaker CD/MP3/Auxiliary stereo and front airbags. This trim included power windows in the front with manual windows in the rear. The "GL" added heated mirrors, air conditioning, power windows, heated seats, a six-speaker stereo, wheel-mounted cruise control, and keyless entry with alarm. The "GLS" trim added wheel-mounted audio controls, ABS, all-round disc brakes, and front seat-mounted side-impact and roof-mounted side curtain airbags. The "GLS" with the Sport Package included a rear spoiler, power sunroof, 16-inch alloy wheels, fog lamps, trip computer and a leather-wrapped steering wheel and leather shifter. The final trim level, the "Limited", added leather seats, a telescopic steering wheel, and automatic climate control air conditioning.

LPI Hybrid 

Hyundai presented the LPI Hybrid at the 2009 Seoul Motor Show, and sales began as the Avante "LPI Hybrid" in the South Korean market in July 2009. The LPI Hybrid (liquefied petroleum injected) is a mild hybrid and is the world's first hybrid electric vehicle to be powered by an internal combustion engine built to run on liquefied petroleum gas (LPG) as a fuel. Hyundai developed the technology and all key components in the LPI Hybrid, together with its local partners including the electric motor, battery and low DC/DC converter. The lithium-ion polymer batteries, which the LPI Hybrid was the first hybrid to adopt, differed from lithium-ion batteries, using a claimedly more stable and fire-resistant dry polymer electrolyte from Korean company LG Chem instead of a liquid or gel.

The LPI Hybrid came equipped with the 1.6 L Gamma engine, a  electric motor, and a continuously variable transmission (CVT). The LPI Hybrid delivered . Compared to the conventional 1.6 L model, and considering South Korean gasoline prices, the LPI Hybrid can travel  for the price of one liter of gasoline, while the conventional model would be able to travel only . The LPI Hybrid produced 90 percent fewer emissions than an equivalent standard gasoline powered model, and LPG is a low carbon emitting hydrocarbon fuel that burns more cleanly than either gasoline or diesel, and also is free of the particulates associated with diesel. The LPI Hybrid shares its powertrain with the Kia Forte LPI Hybrid.

The Elantra hybrid comes with an "Eco Guide" tree icon meant to coach the driver into developing more eco driving habits. The CVT has an optional "E (Eco-Drive)" gear to maximize fuel efficiency. The LPG Hybrid was dropped in Australia due to lack of demand, increase in emphasis on brand image and change in focus to cleaner diesel engines.

Fifth generation (MD/UD; 2010) 

The fifth-generation Avante debuted at the 2010 Busan International Motor Show in April 2010. It was codenamed "MD" for the sedan, "UD" for sedans manufactured in the US, and "JK" for the coupe. For the U.S. and Canadian market, it featured a new 1.8-L gasoline engine. In other markets, it featured a 1.6-L gasoline direct-injection engine, producing  and 167 Nm (123 lb-ft) torque, mated to a new 6-speed automatic or manual transmission. For markets such as the Middle East, the 1.6-L engine was a MPI version that delivers 128 hp. The Israeli market received the Elantra, with a 1.6 GDI 132 hp coupled to a 6-speed automatic transmission only. The design continued Hyundai's "fluidic sculpture" styling theme first seen in the 2011 Sonata. The new model went on sale in August 2010 in South Korea, and began selling between end of 2010 and early 2011 as a 2011 model. The US version of the fifth-generation Elantra debuted at the 2010 Los Angeles Auto Show. It is powered by a new 1.8-L Nu engine producing 148 hp (145 hp-PZEV) and 131 lb-ft (130 lb-ft-PZEV). The fuel economy was aided by a low drag coefficient of just 0.28. The Nu engine block is made of aluminum instead of the previous cast iron.

EPA's estimated gas mileage 40/29 was questioned by Consumer Watchdog, a Santa Monica CA consumer group. USA Today writer Jefferson Graham claimed to get combined city/highway mpg of 22 mpg. However, a real-world test by Popular Mechanics showed significantly better fuel economy than EPA estimated MPG. Also, The Truth About Cars editor tested real-world MPG, leading them to give Consumer Watchdog a thumbs down. The underpinnings of the second-generation i30 and Elantra were similar in their configuration and makeup. The similarities between the second-generation i30 and Elantra continued in front end and suspension characteristics.

It was available in two trim levels, GLS and Limited. Premium features included heated front and rear seats, proximity key entry with electronic push-button start with immobilizer, and touch screen navigation. US 2011 sales reached 186,361 units, up 41 percent from 2010. The Elantra was crowned North American Car of the Year at the 2012 Detroit Auto Show, over the Ford Focus and Volkswagen Passat. The Elantra was crowned South African Car of the Year for 2012. At the 8th Manila International Auto Show, the Elantra was crowned as the Philippine Car of the Year, the first Korean car maker to win the award.
Hyundai Elantra 1.8 GLS won the WesBank's Car of the Year in South Africa and North American Car of the Year at the 2012 Detroit Auto Show.

 2012 model year: An ActiveECO system was now included with automatic transmission models, a dual-shell horn was added, steering calibration was adjusted, fog lights and passenger side sun visor extension were added to the GLS Preferred Package, and some exterior color adjustments were made.
 2013 model year: Manual transmission models received an increase in standard equipment, and heated front seats were added to the GLS Preferred Package. On Limited trims, a power driver seat with lumbar support was now standard and dual-zone automatic climate control was available on the Limited Technology Package. Atlantic Blue was a new exterior color option. Halfway through the model year, audio head units were revised to include separate knobs for volume control and tuning options.

Facelift 

In 2013 for the 2014 model year, the Elantra sedan received significant updates. The GLS trim was changed to SE and an all-new Elantra Sport was now available with a more powerful 2.0 L GDI engine.

Exterior enhancements include new front and rear styling with tinted tail lights and L-shaped fog light housings. Limited and Sport models included projector headlights with LED accents and LED tail lights. New wheel designs were available for all trims, including the base SE, SE with SE Preferred Package, Limited, and Sport models. A driver's blind spot mirror was added and a new Driver Selectable Steering Mode is standard on the Limited and Sport models.

Interior enhancements include raised HVAC vent locations and new HVAC control design; 4.3-inch LCD touchscreen radio with a backup camera on the SE Preferred Package, Limited and Sport models; updated navigation system; increased center armrest location; and straight pull gear selector with leather boot.

 2015 model year: A new SE Style Package is available for SE trims and included a sunroof, leather steering wheel and shifter, projector headlights with LED accents, chrome belt molding, and aluminum door sills. A Sport Tech Package added navigation and premium audio.
 2016 model year: A new Value Edition for the SE package replaced the SE Style Package, and included wheels from the Elantra Coupe SE, sunroof, leather steering wheel and shifter, smart key and push-button start, heated front seats, and side-mirror turn signals. Limited models now included a standard smart key with push-button start and dual-zone climate control. Sport models had reduced pricing, but no longer included leather seats or a sunroof.

Elantra Langdong 
Elantra Langdong (Chinese: 朗動) is a longer version of Elantra for the Chinese market. Released in August 2012, the Langdong sedan is  longer and  wider than the Elantra sold in other markets. Its hexagonal front grille was replaced with a chrome wing-shaped version. The design was based on the Wind Craft concept.

The vehicle was unveiled at the 2012 Beijing Motor Show.

Coupe (JK; 2013–2014) 

For the 2013 model year, a coupe based on the sedan debuted. The coupe featured a continuation of Hyundai's Fluidic Sculpture body design language, with more aggressive styling than the sedan.

The vehicle was unveiled at the 2012 Busan International Motor Show. The production model included a 2.0 Nu GDi Engine with a 6-speed transmission.

The Elantra Coupe was discontinued after the 2014 model year in the US due to poor sales, allowing the brand to focus on the sedan and GT models.

Safety
Insurance Institute for Highway Safety (IIHS) was safety tested by IIHS in 2015

Sixth generation (AD; 2015) 

The sixth generation Elantra was launched in South Korea as the Avante in September 2015. The design of the car has been changed to a more conservative appearance. The "fluidic sculpture" design that persisted across the Hyundai portfolio since 2011 is gone in the sixth generation Elantra. The car is now more like a fastback with its roofline sloped from the windshield to the rear of the car and it has fewer curves overall with pentagonal head and taillights, a hexagonal grille, and redesigned body panels and bumper emphasizing straight lines along the body. The windshield is drawn back from the hood further than the prior generation, making for a more traditional sedan look. The interior is also less curved, with a cockpit, audio/temp controls, and glove compartment in a single bow line across the dash. This was done without reducing the interior cabin space of the prior generation.

In India, the AD series Hyundai Elantra launched on 23 August 2016 with petrol and diesel engine options. Its petrol variant displaces 2.0-litre, while the diesel engine is a 1.6-litre unit.

North America 
The sixth generation Elantra made its North American debut at the November 2015 Los Angeles Auto Show for the 2017 model year, and released for sale in the United States in January 2016, and in Canada in February 2016. Two trim levels are present in the 2017 model release: SE and Limited (Value Edition and Sport released later). While the Elantra is sold under the compact class, it classifies as a mid-size sedan according to the EPA.

Newly introduced for 2017 was the ECO Trim, a package which replaced the standard engine with a lower displacement turbocharged 1.4 L DOHC Inline-4,  Kappa engine along with a 7-speed dual clutch automatic transmission that improved MPG use for eco driving customers.

The new SE model came standard with fewer features compared to the prior generation trim level, and included a  2.0 L Nu I4 engine and mated to either a 6-speed manual or 6-speed automatic transmission. The SE Popular Equipment package which included alloy wheels, cruise control, automatic headlights, and touchscreen stereo with Android Auto and Apple CarPlay support; and a Tech Package (required the Popular Equipment package) included LED daytime running lights, blind-spot and rear cross-traffic alert system, proximity key/push-button start, hands-free trunk access, and TFT monochromatic cluster display (in place of the standard LCD cluster). In North America, the SE Popular Equipment package was not available on SE models with the 6-speed manual transmission.

In the middle of the 2017 model year, steering wheel audio controls become standard equipment across all trims. A mid-level Value Edition trim was also added. On top of the Popular Equipment and Tech Package for the SE, it included a power-adjustable driver's seat, auto-dimming rearview mirror, a power sunroof, and an automatic up driver's power window.

Packages for the Limited Edition includes a Limited Tech Package with a power sunroof, touchscreen stereo with Android Auto and Apple CarPlay support, heated seats, and ClariFi module to enhance interior car audio; and the Ultimate Package (that requires the Limited Tech Package) which adds automatic emergency braking with pedestrian detection, smart cruise control, lane keep assist, and memory presets for mirrors/driver seat adjustments. For 2018 model year the SEL trim was replaced the SE with Popular Equipment Package, and now includes blind-spot monitoring with rear-cross traffic alert and lane change assist, four-wheel disc brakes (instead of front disc brakes and rear drum brakes), and rear-seat cupholders instead of center console-mounted ones. Limited models receive glossy black interior accents and a standard auto-dimming rearview mirror. All models also receive a new machine grey exterior color option and three years of complimentary Blue Link/Homelink services.

Elantra Sport

Roughly halfway through the 2017 model year, Hyundai released a Sport model for the North American market. The Sport slots between the Eco and Limited models and is differentiated externally by different headlights and tail lights, ground effects, a more aggressive front and rear bumper as well as dual chrome-tipped exhaust outlets. Transmission options include a 7-speed dual-clutch automatic with manual shift mode or a traditional 6-speed manual. Additional modifications for the sport include a flat-bottomed steering wheel, red stitching on the seats, shift boot and steering wheel, larger front brakes, 18" alloy wheels, an independent multi-link rear suspension, a thicker front stabilizer bar, and a lower ratio steering ratio for a quicker feel.

2018 model year added power sunroof and blind-spot monitoring with rear cross-traffic alert and lane change assist are standard for the US market.

Engines
The 2019 Elantra 2.0 offered a six-speed automatic transmission. For the 2020 model year, the 2.0 engine will be paired with the continuously variable automatic transmission (CVT) used in the 2019 Kia Forte. This will enable the 2020 Elantra SE to match the Forte FE's 41 miles per U.S. gallon EPA fuel economy rating on the highway. Higher 2.0 trims, which have added weight and different tires, will be rated at 40 mpg on the EPA highway test. The U.S. fueleconomy.gov website shows a city rating of 31 mpg for the 2020 Elantra SE and 30 mpg for higher trims.

The 1.4 Turbo and 1.6 Turbo engines were offered on the 2019 Elantra sedan in the United States, but not in Canada.

Elantra Lingdong PHEV
Hyundai Elantra Lingdong PHEV version is officially launched in China in August 2019 and produced by Beijing Hyundai, a joint venture by BAIC and Hyundai. The Elantra Lingdong PHEV features a restyled front bumper, and is powered by a 1.6 liter engine producing 105 ps plus motor combination power system. The Elantra Lingdong PHEV is capable of an all-electric range up to 85 km, with the fuel consumption of only 1 liter per 100 km under comprehensive conditions. Prices of the Elantra PHEV in China ranges from 157,800-178,800 yuan (~US$22,450 – US$25,438).

2019 facelift
Hyundai extensively refreshed the Elantra for the 2019 model year; it received a new exterior look, new wheel designs, new safety features and an updated center stack. The new redesign's exterior changes include a new rear with redesigned tail lights, "ELANTRA" written across the back, and a hidden trunk release within the Hyundai emblem. New triangular headlights included LED headlights as an option, removing the previously available adaptive HID headlights.

Interior design changes include revised HVAC controls for both manual and automatic systems and newly designed vents. The steering wheel has also been changed to the same design shared with the Kona, Veloster, and Elantra GT. The instrument cluster has an updated font, center display, and a checkerboard pattern. A new 5-inch touchscreen audio is now standard on the base SE trim and comes with a backup camera. The center storage in front of the shifter no longer has a door to conceal storage in order to accommodate the available Qi wireless charging dock for compatible smartphones. Rear heated seats are also no longer an option.

The SEL trim and above now includes previously optional advanced safety equipment, including Forward Collision Avoidance, Lane Keep Assist, and Drive Attention Alert.

On 6 September 2018, the face-lifted Avante was launched in South Korea. Despite tremendous criticism for its design in Korea, the Avante became the fifth best-selling car in the South Korean market.

Other than South Korea, the face-lifted version of the car was also launched as the Avante in Singapore on 10 January 2019, at the 2019 Singapore Motorshow. The Avante was launched with 3 variants, the base model, S variant and Elite variant. As compared to the other 2 higher specification variants, the base model does not come with LED daytime running lights, LED tail lights, keyless engine start, electric folding side mirrors, cruise control and features 15" alloy wheels, as compared to 16" alloy wheels on the other 2 variants. The Elite variant has additional features such as LED headlights, an electric driver seat, multi-zone air conditioning and rain sensing wipers as compared to the S variant.

Hyundai Nishat Motors started assembly of the facelifted model in Pakistan in the last quarter of 2020.

Safety
Insurance Institute for Highway Safety (IIHS) was safety tested by IIHS in 2017

Insurance Institute for Highway Safety (IIHS) was safety tested by IIHS in 2020

Seventh generation (CN7; 2020) 

The seventh generation Elantra, which was released for the 2021 model year, was unveiled on 17 March 2020 in West Hollywood, with model code name CN7. It teased a new "parametric dynamics" design language, and a return to a longer and wider fastback rear end sports sedan style. The interior features more rear legroom and a new instrument panel design with available twin digital display screens. The car went on sale in late 2020 in the U.S. and Canada.

The Elantra includes Hyundai’s Smart Sense safety technology which includes Forward Collision-Avoidance Assist (FCA), Blind-Spot Collision-Avoidance Assist (BCA), Rear Cross Traffic Collision-Avoidance Assist (RCCA), Lane Keeping Assist (LKA) and Smart Cruise Control with Stop & Go (SCC).

It was selected as the 2021 North American Car of the Year.

In Australia and New Zealand, the seventh-generation Elantra is badged as the i30 Sedan, to allow Hyundai to integrate the Elantra with the popular i30 hatchback for combined sales figures.

In Vietnam, the seventh-generation Elantra was introduced on 14 October 2022 and is offered in three grade levels; Standard, Special and N-Line. Engine options include the 1.6-litre petrol engine paired with 6-speed automatic on Standard and Special grades, the 2.0-litre petrol engine paired with 6-speed automatic on Special grade, while the N-Line grade gets the Smartstream G 1.6-litre T-GDi engine paired with 7-speed DCT.

It is the first generation of Elantra to not be sold in any Western Europe country.

Hybrid 
This engine consists of 1.6-liter,  electric motor, and a 1.3-kilowatt-hour lithium-ion battery. The battery can store enough energy for gas free operation at a parking lot speed, and shuts off during coasting. The battery is located underneath the rear seats and the car has a steering ratio of 12.2:1.

Elantra N/Avante N/i30 Sedan N 
In July 2021, the Elantra N was announced as the performance model of the Elantra within the Hyundai N sub-brand. The vehicle is powered by a 2.0-litre turbo I4 engine with a 52 mm turbine wheel that maintains the maximum output from about 5500 rpm for brisk acceleration. It also applies four-point strut rings and rear stiff bars to strengthen body rigidity. In addition, the low and wide design of the vehicle makes it more suitable for better aerodynamic performance. It is available with either a manual transmission or automatic DCT. For DCT models, N Grin Shift (NGS), N Power Shift (NPS) and N Track Sense Shift (NTS) are provided as standard features.

Facelift
The facelifted Avante was revealed in South Korea on 27 February 2023.

Powertrain

Safety 
Insurance Institute for Highway Safety (IIHS) was safety tested by IIHS in 2021

Other versions

Elantra Touring 

The first-generation Hyundai i30cw station wagon was marketed in the United States and Canada as the Hyundai Elantra Touring since the 2009 model year until 2012.

Elantra GT 
The second-generation i30 hatchback was released in the United States and Canada in 2012 as the Hyundai Elantra GT. The nameplate usage continues for the third-generation i30, which was released in 2017 for the 2018 model year. The Elantra GT was discontinued in these markets in 2020 due to the expansion of Hyundai's SUV line-up.

Sales

Naming disputes 
Mitsubishi Motors Australia complained that the Hyundai Elantra was too close to the Elante trim level, which was last used on the 1991 Magna. British Lotus Cars and South Korean Kia Motors said that the Elantra name was too close to the Lotus Elan and its Kia counterpart. Germany's Audi, meanwhile, complained that "Avante" was too close to Avant (used for Audi station wagons/estates). In 2001, both the Elan and the Elante had ceased production but the Avante's renaming remained necessary as Audi owned the Avant name in Europe and continued to produce it. Because of these naming problems, the Elantra received "Lantra" badges in many markets while "Avante" was mainly used in the South Korean domestic market.

There are also disputes about the chassis codes for the 1996–2000 and the 1999–2000 model years. Hyundai states that the codename of the 1996–98 Elantra is RD and not J2, and the 1999–2000 Elantra's codename is RD2 and not J3.

References

External links 

 (N Performance)
 (Hyundai N)
 (Hyundai N - N-Line)

2000s cars
2010s cars
Cars introduced in 1990
Compact cars
Coupés
Euro NCAP large family cars
Front-wheel-drive vehicles
Hatchbacks
Elantra
Police vehicles
Sedans
Station wagons
Touring cars
Vehicles with CVT transmission